Adamantios Polemis is a Greek major shipowner and shareholder of Panathinaikos FC. He was the president of Polembros Maritime, that was, back then, inside the 10 biggest Greek shipping companies, until 2014, when he left from the company. Nowdays, he is president of New Shipping Company.

References

Living people
Greek football chairmen and investors
Businesspeople from Athens
Greek businesspeople in shipping
Panathinaikos A.O.
Panathinaikos F.C.
Year of birth missing (living people)